Llandrinio Road railway station was a station to the northeast of Criggion, Powys, Wales. The station opened in 1871 and closed in 1932. The station was sited a mile to the south east of Llandrinio at Criggion Bridge on the road to Crew Green hence the "Road" suffix. There was a single brick platform on the west side of the road level crossing with a goods siding on the north side of the line.

References

Further reading

Disused railway stations in Powys
Railway stations in Great Britain opened in 1871
Railway stations in Great Britain closed in 1932